José Vicente Salinas (5 April 1904 – 1975) was a Chilean sprinter. He competed in the men's 400 metres at the 1928 Summer Olympics.

References

External links
 

1909 births
1975 deaths
Athletes (track and field) at the 1928 Summer Olympics
Chilean male sprinters
Olympic athletes of Chile
Place of birth missing
20th-century Chilean people